USS Virginian was a United States Navy tug in commission from 1918 to 1919.

Virginian was built as the commercial tug Blue Bell or Blue Belle in 1904 at Camden, New Jersey. She subsequently was renamed SS Virginian. The U.S. Navy acquired her for World War I service from her owner, the Southern Transportation Company, at Philadelphia, Pennsylvania probably sometime in late 1917. The Navy apparently commissioned her sometime in early 1918 as USS Virginian.

Virginian served as a tug in the 5th Naval District—probably at Norfolk, Virginia, through the end of World War I and into the early months of 1919.

On 12 May 1919, Virginian was returned to the Southern Transportation Company and her name was stricken from the Navy List.

Unlike most commercial ships commissioned into U.S. Navy service during World War I, Virginian never received a naval registry Identification Number (Id. No.).

Notes

References

Department of the Navy: Naval Historical Center Online Library of Selected Images:  Civilian Ships: Virginian (American Steam Tug, 1904). Previously named Blue Bell. Served as USS Virginian in 1918-1919
NavSource Online: Section Patrol Craft Photo Archive: Virginian

Tugs of the United States Navy
Ships built in Camden, New Jersey
1904 ships
World War I auxiliary ships of the United States